The Duhallow Junior A Hurling Championship (known for sponsorship reasons as the Kanturk Co-Op Mart Junior A Hurling Championship) is an annual hurling competition organised by the Duhallow Board of the Gaelic Athletic Association since 1933 for junior hurling teams in the Barony of Duhallow in County Cork, Ireland.

The series of games are played during the summer and autumn months. The championship starts with 2 groups and the group winners and runners-up advance to the knockout stage. This gives each team at least 2 matches.

The Duhallow Junior Championship is an integral part of the wider Cork Junior Hurling Championship. The winners and runners-up of the Duhallow championship join their counterparts from the other six divisions to contest the county championship.

Dromtarriffe are the title-holders after defeating Banteer by 1-26 to 1-13 in the 2022 championship final.

Format

Group stage 
The 8 teams are divided into two groups of four. Over the course of the group stage, each team plays once against the others in the group, resulting in each team being guaranteed at least three games. Two points are awarded for a win, one for a draw and zero for a loss. The teams are ranked in the group stage table by points gained, then scoring difference and then their head-to-head record. The top two teams in each group qualify for the knockout stage.

Knockout stage 
Semi-finals: The two group winners and the two runners-up from the group stage contest this round. The two winners from these games advance to the final.

Final: The two semi-final winners contest the final. The winning team are declared champions.

Promotion and relegation 
At the end of the championship, the winning team enters the Cork Junior A Hurling Championship and by winning this, they will be promoted to the Cork Premier Junior Hurling Championship for the following season. There is no relegation to the Duhallow Junior B Hurling Championship.

Teams
As of 2023, the competing teams include:

Roll of honour

List of finals

Records and statistics

Gaps

Top ten longest gaps between successive championship titles:

 55 years: Castlemagner (1960-2015)
 47 years: Tullylease (1961-2008)
 40 years: Newmarket (1979-2019)
 38 years: Banteer (1957-1995)
 33 years: Kanturk (1969-2002)
 29 years: Millstreet (1933-1962)
 27 years: Meelin (1943-1970)
 16 years: Kanturk (1949-1965)
 14 years: Banteer (1938-1952)
 14 years: Newmarket (1950-1964)

Consecutive wins 
Quintuple
 Kanturk (1965, 1966, 1967, 1968, 1969)

Quadruple 

 Kilbrin (2011, 2012, 2013, 2014)

Treble 

 Newmarket (1934, 1935, 1936)
 Meelin (1939, 1940, 1941)
 Newmarket (1946, 1947, 1948)
 Banteer (1955, 1956, 1957)
 Meelin (1970, 1971, 1972, 1973)
 Newmarket (1974, 1975, 1976)
 Meelin (1980, 1981, 1982)
 Lismire (1983, 1984, 1985)
 Dromtarriffe (2020, 2021, 2022)

Double 

 Castlemagner (1953, 1954)
 Tullylease (1958, 1959)
 Millstreet (1962, 1963)
 Meelin (1990, 1991)
 Meelin (1993, 1994)
 Freemount (1997, 1998)
 Freemount (2000, 2001)
 Kanturk (2002, 2003)
 Meelin (2009, 2010)

Single 

 Kilbrin (1978, 1989, 1992, 1999, 2004, 2007, 2016)
 Banteer (1938, 1952, 1995, 2006, 2017)
 Newmarket (1942, 1950, 1964, 1979, 2019)
 Meelin (1943, 1977, 1986, 1996)
 Tullylease (1945, 1961, 2008)
 Castlemagner (1951, 1960, 2015)
 Kanturk (1944, 1949)
 Freemount (1988, 2005)
 Millstreet (1933)
 Lismire (1987)
 Dromtarriffe (2018)

Debut final for clubs

County record 

List of every Duhallow appearance in the Cork Junior A Hurling Championship final

Roll of honour

Junior B Hurling Championship

2023 teams

Roll of honour

See also
Duhallow Junior A Football Championship

References

Hurling competitions in County Cork